The 21st Stinkers Bad Movie Awards were released by the Hastings Bad Cinema Society in 1999 to honor the worst films the film industry had to offer in 1998.

According to founders Ray Wright and Mike Lancaster, they were quite surprised by how The Avengers lost to Spice World in the run for Worst Picture. They also stated that while pressured to include Armageddon and Godzilla on the Worst Picture ballot, they ultimately felt that Blues Brothers 2000 was more deserving. They then admitted that if they expanded the Worst Picture category to ten films, they would have added Armaggeddon, Babe: Pig in the City, Godzilla, Krippendorf's Tribe, and Meet the Deedles to the ballot. Lancaster put Lost in Space as the one 1998 film among his five worst movies of the 1990s, alongside It's Pat, Kids, Nothing but Trouble, and Ready to Wear.

Listed as follows are the different categories with their respective winners and nominees, including Worst Picture and its dishonorable mentions, which are films that were considered for Worst Picture but ultimately failed to make the final ballot (39 total). All winners are highlighted.

Winners and Nominees

Worst Picture

Dishonorable Mentions 

 Air Bud: Golden Receiver (Dimension)
 Armageddon (Touchstone)
 Babe: Pig in the City (Universal)
 Barney's Great Adventure (PolyGram)
 BASEketball (Universal)
 Blade (New Line)
 Chairman of the Board (Trimark)
 Deep Impact (Paramount)
 Fear and Loathing in Las Vegas (Universal)
 54 (Miramax)
 Godzilla (aka "Godawful") (TriStar)
 Great Expectations (Fox)
 He Got Game (Touchstone)
 Hope Floats (Fox)
 Hush (TriStar)
 I Still Know What You Did Last Summer (Columbia)
 Kissing a Fool (Universal)
 Krippendorf's Tribe (Touchstone)
 Lethal Weapon 4 (Warner Bros.)
 Major League: Back to the Minors (Warner Bros.)
 The Man in the Iron Mask (United Artists)
 Meet Joe Black (Universal)
 Meet the Deedles (Disney)
 The Odd Couple II (Paramount)
 Patch Adams (Universal)
 Psycho (the shot-for-shot remake) (Universal)
 The Replacement Killers (Columbia)
 Six Days, Seven Nights (Touchstone)
 Slappy and the Stinkers (TriStar)
 Snake Eyes (Paramount)
 Species II (MGM)
 Sphere (Warner Bros.)
 Tarzan and the Lost City (Warner Bros.)
 The Thin Red Line (Fox)
 3 Ninjas: High Noon at Mega Mountain (TriStar)
 U.S. Marshals (Warner Bros.)
 John Carpenter's Vampires (Columbia)
 The Waterboy (Touchstone)
 Wrongfully Accused (Warner Bros.)

Worst Director

Worst Actor

Worst Actress or British Singing Group Pretending to Act

Worst Supporting Actor

Worst Supporting Actress

Worst Sequel 
{| class="wikitable sortable plainrowheaders" border="1" cellpadding="5" cellspacing="0" align="centre"
! Recipient
! Percentage of Votes
|-
|- style="background:#B0C4DE;"
| I Still Know What You Did Last Summer (Columbia)| 31%|-
|Blues Brothers 2000 (Universal)
| 21%
|-
|The Odd Couple II (Paramount)
| 15%
|-
|Species II (MGM)
| 19%
|-
|U.S. Marshals (Warner Bros.)
| 14%
|-
|}

 Worst Screenplay for a Film Grossing Over $100M Worldwide Using Hollywood Math 
{| class="wikitable sortable plainrowheaders" border="1" cellpadding="5" cellspacing="0" align="centre"
! Recipient
! Percentage of Votes
|-
|- style="background:#B0C4DE;"
| Godzilla (TriStar), story by Ted Elliot, Terry Rossio, Dean Devlin, and Roland Emmerich; screenplay by Devlin and Emmerich; based on Toho's Godzilla franchise| 41%|-
|Armageddon (Touchstone), story by Robert Roy Pool and Jonathan Hensleigh; screenplay by Hensleigh and J. J. Abrams
| 24%
|-
|Deep Impact (Paramount), written by Bruce Joel Rubin and Michael Tolkin
| 7%
|-
|Lethal Weapon 4 (Warner Bros.), story by Jonathan Lemkin, Alfred Gough, and Miles Millar; screenplay by Channing Gibson; based on characters created by Shane Black
| 12%
|-
|Patch Adams (Universal), written by Steve Oedekerk; based on Gesundheit: Good Health Is a Laughing Matter by Patch Adams and Maureen Mylander
| 16%
|-
|}

 Worst Resurrection of a TV Show 
{| class="wikitable sortable plainrowheaders" border="1" cellpadding="5" cellspacing="0" align="centre"
! Recipient
! Percentage of Votes
|-
|- style="background:#B0C4DE;"
| The Avengers (Warner Bros.)| 51%|-
|Barney's Great Adventure (PolyGram)
| 24%
|-
|Lost in Space (New Line)
| 25%
|-
|}

 Worst On-Screen Couple 

 The Sequel Nobody Was Clamoring For 
{| class="wikitable sortable plainrowheaders" border="1" cellpadding="5" cellspacing="0" align="centre"
! Recipient
! Percentage of Votes
|-
|- style="background:#B0C4DE;"
| Major League: Back to the Minors (Warner Bros.)| 27%|-
|Air Bud: Golden Receiver (Dimension)
| 22%
|-
|Babe: Pig in the City (Universal)
| 14%
|-
|Blues Brothers 2000 (Universal)
| 12%
|-
|3 Ninjas: High Noon at Mega Mountain (TriStar)
| 25%
|-
|}

 Most Annoying Fake Accent 

 Most Painfully Unfunny Comedy 

 Most Unwelcome Direct-to-Video Release 

 Worst Song in a Motion Picture 

 Worst On-Screen Hairstyle 

 The Founders Award - What Were They Thinking and Why? 
 The Academy of Motion Pictures Arts and Sciences for honoring Elia Kazan with a Lifetime Achievement Award The Motion Picture Association of America for rating Babe: Pig in the City "G" and Orgazmo "NC-17" Universal Pictures for thinking Psycho'' was a good idea in the first place

 Miscellaneous Awards 
 Worst TV Show: The Magic Hour''
 Worst Album: Wild Prairie by Mariah Carey
 Worst Radio Show (Syndicated): Delilah @ RadioDelilah.com

Films with multiple nominations and wins
The following films received multiple nominations:

Note: For each film with an asterisk, one of those nominations was the Founders Award.

The following films received multiple awards:

References 

Stinkers Bad Movie Awards
Stinkers Bad Movie Awards